John Robert (Bob) Braithwaite MBE  (28 September 1925 – 26 February 2015) was a British trap shooter who represented his country at the 1964 Summer Olympics and the 1968 Summer Olympics, winning a gold medal at the latter.

Biography 
Born at Arnside, Cumbria, and educated at the Friends School Lancaster and the University of Edinburgh, Braithwaite qualified as a Veterinary Surgeon in 1947.

Already a notable game shot, in 1956 he began competing in trap shooting events and within a short time he had become one of the country's leading target shooters. In 1964 he gained a place in the British Shooting Team for the Tokyo Olympic Games where he was placed 7th in the Trap Event.

Qualifying again for the 1968 Games in Mexico City his busy veterinary practice provided him with little time to travel to the few training grounds available.  Instead he installed a powerful oscillating trap on a piece of ground known as Rough Lot, adjacent to the Braithwaites' old family farm. With the help of the local priest, who volunteered to operate the trap, Braithwaite would shoot 50 targets twice a week.

At the Mexico Games the trap event consisted of 200 targets in eight stages shot over two days. In the first stage Braithwaite missed two targets. He then proceeded to break every one of the subsequent 175 targets equalling the Olympic record and earning for himself the gold medal. He shot alongside fellow GB and friend, Eric Grantham from East Yorkshire.

Though he won many other events during his career, inevitably it is for his Olympic victory that he is best remembered. Braithwaite's achievement represents one of the last occasions in the history of the Olympic Games in which a gifted amateur with steely determination and great skill won over a field consisting predominantly of commercially sponsored and government-funded professionals.

Olympic results

References

1925 births
2015 deaths
English Olympic medallists
Olympic gold medallists for Great Britain
Members of the Order of the British Empire
Olympic shooters of Great Britain
Olympic medalists in shooting
Alumni of the University of Edinburgh
Shooters at the 1964 Summer Olympics
Shooters at the 1968 Summer Olympics
Medalists at the 1968 Summer Olympics
British male sport shooters
People from Arnside